Barr Cola is a cola made from kola nuts by the A.G. Barr company, makers of Irn-Bru.  The drink was first released in 1875. It was once called Strike Cola and was popular in Britain's fish and chip shops and convenience stores. The drink is often enjoyed by the youth of Britain. Now it is still enjoyed by many, but largely overshadowed by the companies bigger drink Irn-Bru. Barr Cola can be purchased in 250ml bottles, 330ml cans, 500ml bottles, 750ml glass bottles and 2 litre plastic bottles. Barr’s Cola is suitable for vegans. The drink is produced in the A.G. Barr factory's in Forfar, Milton Keynes and Cumbernauld. Each factory can produce up to 120,000 cans of Barr Cola (or other Barr flavours) every minute. Barr Cola and it's different flavours are sold in the supermarkets Sainsburys, Asda, Morrisons and Iceland. They can also be bought in many smaller establishments throughout the UK.

British soft drink brands
Cola brands
Scottish drinks